Alan Woollett was a locally born defender who played for Leicester City during what many people believe  to have been their golden era in the late 1960s and early 1970s. Steady and committed he was a member  of the losing 1969 FA Cup Final side and was eventually awarded a testimonial against Chelsea in 1977. In 2003 ex-Fox Steve Earle revealed that, unlike many players from that era, Woollett had never considered a move to the United States because he could not bear to be parted from his dog. When it eventually died he was too distraught to travel with the squad for a game against Liverpool in May 1973. Manager Jimmy Bloomfield tried to get his teammates to show some respectful sympathy – a feat teammate Len Glover was singularly unable to manage.

References

1947 births
Leicester City F.C. players
Living people
English footballers
Association football defenders
FA Cup Final players